Inertance is a measure of the pressure difference in a fluid required to cause a unit change in the rate of change of volumetric flow-rate with time.

The inertance of a tube is given by:
 

where
  is the density (with dimensionality of mass per volume) of the fluid
  is the length of the tube
  is the cross-sectional area of the tube

The pressure difference is related to the change in flow-rate by the equation:
 

where
  is the pressure of the fluid
  is the volumetric flow-rate (with dimensionality of volume per time)

This equation assumes constant density, that the acceleration is uniform, and that the flow is fully developed "plug flow".  This precludes sharp bends, water hammer, and so on.

To some, it may appear counterintuitive that an increase in cross-sectional area of a tube reduces the inertance of the tube. However, for the same mass flow-rate, a lower cross-sectional area implies a higher fluid velocity and therefore a higher pressure difference to accelerate the fluid.

In respiratory physiology, inertance (of air) is measured in cm s2 L−1.

 1 cm s2 L−1 ≈ 98100 Pa s2 m−3.

Using small-signal analysis, an inertance can be represented as a fluid reactance (cf. electrical reactance) through the relation:

 

where
 
  is the frequency in Hz.

References

Fluid mechanics